This is a list of New Zealand television events and premieres that occurred in 2012, the 52nd year of continuous operation of television in New Zealand.

Events
2 December – 15-year-old singer and guitarist Clara van Wel wins the second series of New Zealand's Got Talent.

Premieres

Domestic
29 April – Big Angry Fish (TV3) (2012)
6 May – Pocket Protectors (TV2) (also Canada) (2012)
1 June – Hounds (TV3) (2012)
4 July – The Block NZ (TV3) (2012–present)
13 July – Jono and Ben (TV3) (2012–present)
31 August – Now is the Hour (TV2) (2012)

International
3 March –  ThunderCats (2011) (TV2)
7 June – / Jim Henson's Pajanimals (TV2)
11 June – // Dinosaur Train (TV2)
5 December –  Alcatraz (TV One)
 Olly the Little White Van (TVNZ Kidzone)
 Punky (TVNZ Kidzone)
 Jake and the Never Land Pirates (TV2)

Television shows

Ending this year

Births

Deaths

References